Gvazava is a Georgian surname. Notable people with the surname include:

 Giorgi Gvazava (1869–1941), Georgian jurist, writer, and politician
 Levan Gvazava (born 1980), Georgian footballer and manager

Georgian-language surnames